Keesing is a surname. Notable people with the surname include:

Felix M. Keesing, anthropologist
Nancy Keesing, Australian writer and editor
Roger Keesing, anthropologist and son of Felix Keesing
Isaac Keesing, Dutch publisher